Amit Khare (born 1961) is an Indian Administrative Service officer (1985 batch) from Bihar/Jharkhand cadre  and is currently serving as the advisor to prime minister Narendra Modi.  He is noted for his role in bringing to light the Fodder scam, in which Rs. 940 crores were embezzled in Bihar over many years, and successive chief ministers
Jagannath Mishra and Lalu Yadav have been imprisoned.

Early life
He was born in a religious Chitraguptvanshi Kayastha family and did his schooling from Kendriya Vidyalaya, Hinoo in 1977 and then finished his Bachelor's with Honors from St. Stephen's College, Delhi. He has an elder brother Atul Khare, who is an Indian Foreign Service officer.

Career

In late 1995, Bihar was in a financial crunch. The then charismatic yet 'native' leader Lalu Prasad Yadav was the Chief Minister of undivided Bihar, where the then finance commissioner VS Dubey stumbled upon the financial irregularities of massive scale. In December 1995, Dubey was, as part of his job, reviewing the performance of various departments. He found that money was withdrawn in excess of the allocation by some of the department. Khare, who was then District Magistrate at Chaibasa, noted that the district animal husbandry department had withdrawn Rs 10 crore and Rs 9 crore twice without giving any details. Even when questioned, there was no response from the animal husbandry department.  Finally, in January 1996,Khare visited the office to investigate, and found it looking as if "someone had tried to destroy files in a hurry".  Many bogus bills were for amounts just under Rs. 10 lakhs (when there are more stringent authorization norms).  It seemed that such payments had been going on for years.  The next day, simultaneous raids conducted at Ranchi and elsewhere found similar practices. This was the first evidence of the scam, which gathered momentum after regional CBI director U. N. Biswas defied political pressures to pursue the case up to the chief minister level.  Those convicted include the preceding DM of Chaibasa, IAS officer Sajal Chakraborty.

Khare has interests in Education and has served the State Elementary education secretary for several terms, and has also worked at the Ministry of Human Resource Development at the center. He also served as a vice-chancellor of the Ranchi University. He helped introduce the National Education Policy 2020 which was approved by the cabinet on 29 July 2020. He has also served as principal secretary to Jharkhand governor Ved Marwah, and as Collector and DM, Patna.

He has served as Secretary in the Ministry of Information and Broadcasting. On 14 December 2019, he assumed charge as Secretary, Ministry of Education (Department of Higher Education) with additional charge of School Education - in background of ongoing negotiations with JNU students regarding fee hike and campus lockdown. Khare was appointed advisor to PM Narendra Modi on 12 October 2021.

References

1961 births
Bihar cadre civil servants
Indian Administrative Service officers
Living people